Maksym Serhiyovych Demchuk (born 12 October 1998) is a Ukrainian professional footballer who plays as a centre-back for Ukrainian club Nyva Ternopil.

References

External links
 
 

1998 births
Living people
Ukrainian footballers
Association football defenders
FC Chornomorets Odesa players
FC Nyva Ternopil players
Ukrainian First League players
Ukrainian Second League players
Sportspeople from Zhytomyr Oblast